Serpentine may refer to:

Shapes 
 Serpentine shape, a shape resembling a serpent
 Serpentine curve, a mathematical curve
 Serpentine, a type of riding figure

Science and nature 
 Serpentine subgroup, a group of minerals
 Serpentinite, a type of rock
 Serpentine soil, soil derived from serpentinite
 Serpentine (alkaloid), a chemical compound
 Serpentine receptor, a protein in cellular membranes
 Serpentine powder, a type of gunpowder

Objects 
 Serpentine lock, a component of matchlock pistols
 Serpentine (cannon), a military weapon
 Serpentine belt, an automotive component
 Serpentine streamer, a party accessory

Places

Australia
 Serpentine, Victoria, Australia, a town
 Serpentine, Western Australia, a town
 Serpentine Dam, Tasmania, the dam used to contain Lake Pedder in Tasmania, Australia
 Serpentine Dam, Western Australia, the water-supply dam for Perth, in Western Australia
 Serpentine Pipehead Dam, in Western Australia
 Serpentine Gorge, gorge in the West MacDonnell Ranges in Australia's Northern Territory
 Serpentine Lakes, salt lakes in the Great Victoria Desert of Australia
 Serpentine National Park, Western Australia

Elsewhere
 Serpentine (lake), in London, England
 La Serpentine, a mountain of the Alps
 Serpentine Road, in Western Patna, India
 Serpentine Hot Springs, Alaska

Music
 Serpentine (album), a 2002 goth metal album by Flowing Tears
 "Serpentine" (song), a 2011 country song by Tiffany
 Serpentines (Ingrid Laubrock album), a 2016 album
 A 2010 alternative metal song by Disturbed on Asylum
 A 2006 pop electronica song by Kate Havnevik on Melankton
 A 2006 electronica song by My My on A Bugged Out Mix
 A 2002 pop song by the Norwegian band Motorpsycho
 A 2009 synthpop song by Peaches on I Feel Cream
 A 1987 indie rock song by Yo La Tengo on New Wave Hot Dogs

Other uses
 Serpentine system, in structuring competitions
 Serpentine (book), a 2020 fantasy story by Philip Pullman
 Serpentine (1979) book by Thomas Thompson (American author)
 Serpentine (horse), racehorse winner of the 2020 Epsom Derby
 Serpentine (video game), a 1982 action game made for the Apple II
 Serpentine, a race in the Ninjago TV series

See also
 
 Serpent (disambiguation)
 Serpentina (disambiguation)
 Serpentine Dam (disambiguation)
 Serpentine River (disambiguation), several waterways